Reichenbach im Kandertal is a railway station in the municipality of Reichenbach im Kandertal in the Swiss canton of Bern. The station is located on the Lötschberg line of the BLS AG, and is adjacent to the village of Reichenbach.

Services 
The following services stop at Reichenbach im Kandertal:

The station is also served by PostAuto bus services up the valley of the Kander river to Frutigen, and up the valley of the Chiene river to Kiental and Griesalp.

References

External links 
 
 

Railway stations in the canton of Bern
BLS railway stations